Mahakshatriya is a 1994 Indian Kannada-language action film directed by Rajendra Singh Babu, starring Vishnuvardhan, Sonu Walia, Ramkumar, Sudha Rani and B. C. Patil. Rajendra Singh Babu won Best Director Filmfare award.

Plot
The story revolves around a young man who is short-tempered but good at heart who goes to prison for committing a murder. The prison officer helps him in becoming a good man.

Cast
 Vishnuvardhan 
 Sonu Walia
 Ramkumar
 Sudha Rani
 B. C. Patil
 Rahul Dev
 Shankar Ashwath
 Sushma Veer
 Sadashiva Brahmavar
 M. V. Vasudev rao
 Kunigal Nagabhushan
 Shankar Patil
 Gururaj Hosakote

Soundtrack
This film is well known for the hugely popular philosophical song "Ee Bhoomi Bannada Buguri", sung by S. P. Balasubrahmanyam. Hamsalekha composed the lyrics and music for this song. This song has also been picturised very well in the film.

 "Ee Bhoomi Bannada Buguri" – S. P. Balasubrahmanyam
 "Tavare Kendavare" – K. S. Chithra, S. P. Balasubrahmanyam
 "Yenaithi Olage Yenaithi" – Malgudi Subha, Gururaj Hosakote
 "Chumbana Chumbana" – K. S. Chitra
 "O Prema O Prema" – K. S. Chitra, S. P. Balasubrahmanyam

External links
 An official website on VishnuVardhan

References 

1994 films
1990s Kannada-language films
Films scored by Hamsalekha
Films directed by Rajendra Singh Babu
Indian action films